"Homo Sapiens" is the first proper single release from The Cooper Temple Clause's third album Make This Your Own released on 22 January 2007. A promotional blank CD-R and sleeve with artwork were given out to fans at gigs on the band's 2006 UK tour. It reached number thirty-six on the UK Singles Chart.

Video
In the video, the band do battle with wild animals and masked hunters in a rural estate. It was sent to MTV2.

Track listing
CD single
"Homo Sapiens"

"The Clan"

7"
"Homo Sapiens"
"Pins and Needles"

7"
"Homo Sapiens"
"Haunted by You"

Japanese EP
"Homo Sapiens"
"U93"
"Damage"
"The Clan"
"Talking to Pylons"

References

2006 singles
The Cooper Temple Clause songs
2006 songs